Robert Surtees may refer to:

Robert Surtees (cinematographer) (1906–1985), American cinematographer
Robert Surtees (antiquarian) (1779–1834), historian and antiquarian
Robert Smith Surtees (1805–1864), English writer